3 Maja Street in Katowice (3 May Street) is a street in the centre of Katowice. The street was built in the 19th century. During World War II the street was called Grundmannstraße, 1867−1922 Grundmannstraße, 1856−1867 Industriestraße.

The street starts at the Market Square in Katowice. It passes through the Wawelska Street, Wilhelm Szewczyk Square, Stawowa Street, and Juliusza Słowackiego Street. The street ends at Wolności Square.

Buildings 
 Synagogue
 Old tenement houses
 Cinema "Światowid"

References 

Streets in Katowice
3 Maja Street in Poland